Rectify is an American television drama series created by Ray McKinnon. The series stars Aden Young as Daniel Holden, a man who was convicted and put on death row at the age of 18, for the rape and murder of his childhood sweetheart. When new evidence comes to light, Daniel is released and returns to his family in his old hometown.

The series premiered on Sundance TV on April 22, 2013. On May 1, 2013, Sundance TV ordered a second season of ten episodes, which premiered on June 19, 2014. On August 18, 2014, a third season was ordered by Sundance TV, that premiered on July 9, 2015. Prior to its third season premiere, Rectify was renewed for a fourth season. The fourth and final season, consisting of eight episodes, premiered on October 26, 2016.

Series overview

Episodes

Season 1 (2013)

Season 2 (2014)

Season 3 (2015)

Season 4 (2016)

Home video release

References

External links
 
 

Lists of American drama television series episodes